The Piccirilli brothers were an Italian family of renowned marble carvers and sculptors who carved many of the most significant marble sculptures in the United States, including Daniel Chester French’s colossal Abraham Lincoln (1920) in the Lincoln Memorial, Washington, D.C.

History

In 1888, Giuseppe Piccirilli (1844–1910), a well-known stone carver in Massa and a veteran of Garibaldi's Unification war, brought his family to New York City. Giuseppe, who was born in Rome and received his early training in the atelier of Roman sculptor Stefano Galletti, came from a long line of stone carvers, unbroken since the days of the early Renaissance. All six of Giuseppe's sons—Ferruccio (1864–1945), Attilio (1866–1945), Furio (1868–1949), Masaniello (aka Thomas) (1870–1951), Orazio (aka Horatio, Horace) (1872–1954) and  Getulio (1874–1945)—were trained as marble cutters and carvers.

Although the Piccirilli Brothers were known primarily as architectural modelers and the carvers of other sculptors' works, Attilio and Furio further distinguished themselves as sculptors in their own right.

The family lived in a brownstone on 142nd Street in the Mott Haven section of the Bronx and set up a workshop next to their home that eventually occupied an entire city block.

At that time most prominent sculptors created their original work in clay.  From that clay model a caster generated a plaster model. The model was then sent to the Piccirilli Brothers who carved it from stone, typically marble, although limestone and granite were also used. The brothers became the carvers of choice for many American sculptors of the time including Daniel Chester French and Paul Wayland Bartlett.

Besides their work as carvers the Piccirilli Brothers also created architectural detailing and embellishments for many public and private buildings.

One of the great losses in American art history occurred when the Piccirilli Brothers studio quietly closed its doors in 1945 and no move was made to secure their records, so the accounts of much of what they had accomplished were lost.

Original sculpture by the Piccirilli Brothers
 USS Maine National Monument, H. Van Buren Magonigle, architect, Atillio Piccirilli, sculptor 1913; Columbus Circle, New York City.
 Firemen's Memorial, H. Van Buren Magonigle, architect, Atillio Piccirilli, sculptor figures of Courage and Duty 1913: Riverside Park at 100th Street, New York City
 Much of the stonework on the California Building in San Diego’s Balboa Park and the attached buildings at the Panama-California Exposition (1915).
 Manitoba Legislative Building, 1919, Simon and Boddington, architects, figures of Sieur de La Vérendrye and Lord Selkirk, plus many architectural figures and details,  Winnipeg, Manitoba
 Stonework outside Riverside Church, Allen & Collens and Henry C. Pelton architects, Atillio Piccirilli, sculptor 1930; Riverside Drive, New York City
Fiorello H. LaGuardia Grave Memorial. Woodlawn Cemetery, New York Lombardo, Joseph Vincent. Piccirilli: Life of an American Sculptor. Pitman Publishing Corporation, Chicago.

Selected works carved for other sculptors
 Washington Square Arch (1895), Stanford White, architect, New York City. 
Spandrel figures (1895), Frederick MacMonnies, sculptor.
George Washington as Commander-in-Chief, Accompanied by Fame and Valor (1916), Hermon Atkins MacNeil, sculptor.
George Washington as President, Accompanied by Wisdom and Justice (1918), Alexander Stirling Calder.
 New York Stock Exchange Building (1903), George B. Post, architect, New York City.
 Pedimental sculpture: Integrity Protecting the Works of Man (1904), John Quincy Adams Ward and Paul Wayland Bartlett, sculptors
 U.S. Custom House, Cass Gilbert, architect, New York City.
 The Four Continents (1907), Daniel Chester French, sculptor
 12 cornice statues (1907), Charles Grafly, Frederick Ruckstull, Augustus Lukeman, and other sculptors
 Civic Virtue Fountain (1909), Frederick MacMonnies, sculptor, Thomas Hastings, architect. Originally created for New York's City Hall Park, moved in 1941 to Queens Borough Hall, moved to Green-Wood Cemetery in 2012.
 Statue of Samuel Spencer, collaboration with Daniel Chester French and Henry Bacon (1910)
 Pennsylvania State Capitol sculpture groups (1911), George Grey Barnard, sculptor, Joseph Miller Huston, architect, Harrisburg, Pennsylvania.
 Brooklyn Museum, McKim, Mead, and White, architects, Brooklyn, New York City.
Pedimental sculpture: Science and Art (1913), Daniel Chester French and Adolph Alexander Weinman, sculptors
 30 cornice figures (1913), Augustus Lukeman, Karl Bitter, Charles Keck, Janet Scudder, Herbert Adams, Carl Heber and others, sculptors,
 Pedimental sculpture: Apotheosis of Democracy (1916), House of Representatives Wing, United States Capitol, Paul Bartlett, sculptor, Thomas U. Walter, architect, Washington, D.C.  
 New York Public Library Main Branch, (1911) Carrère and Hastings, architects, New York City.
Pedimental sculptures: The Arts (1917) and History (1917), George Grey Barnard, sculptor
6 cornice figures (1917), each , Paul Wayland Bartlett, sculptor 
 Patience and Fortitude (1911), 2 lions flanking the entrance, Edward Clark Potter, sculptor.
 Death and the Sculptor (1917), Daniel Chester French, sculptor, Metropolitan Museum of Art. Carved from French's 1893 plaster model.
 Abraham Lincoln (1920), Daniel Chester French, sculptor, Lincoln Memorial, Washington, D.C.
 DuPont Circle Fountain (1921), Daniel Chester French, sculptor, Henry Bacon, architect, Washington, D.C.
 Tomb of the Unknowns (Tomb of the Unknown Soldier) (1931), Thomas Hudson Jones, sculptor, Lorimer Rich, architect, Arlington National Cemetery, Arlington, Virginia
 Waldo Hutchins bench (1932), Eric Gugler, architect, Central Park, Manhattan, New York City

See also
 Yule Marble

References

Baker, Marilyn, Manitoba’s Third Legislative Building: Symbols in Stone: The At and Politics of a Public Building, Hyperion Press Limited, Winnipeg, Manitoba 1986
Balfour, Alan, Rockefeller Center – Architecture As Theater, McGraw-Hill Book Company, NY, NY 1978
Bogart, Michele H., Public Sculpture and the Civic Ideal in New York City: 1890–1930, University of Chicago Press, Chicago 1989
Contemporary American Sculpture Issued for the Exhibition held by the National Sculpture Society in Cooperation with the Trustees of the California Palace of the Legion of Honor,  MCMXXIX, National Sculpture Society, NY  1929
Gardner, Albert Ten Eyck, American Sculpture: A catalogue of the Collection of the Metropolitan Museum of Art, The Metropolitan Museum of Art, 1965
Kvaran, Einar Einarsson and Walt Lockley, Guide to Architectural Sculpture in America, unpublished manuscript
Lombardo, Josef Vincent, Atilio Piccirilli: Life of an American Sculptor, Pitman Publishing Corporation, New York  1944
Reynolds, Donald Martin, Monuments and Masterpieces; Histories and views of Public Sculpture in New York City, Macmillan Publishing Company, New York 1988
Somma, Thomas P. The Apotheosis of Democracy, 1908–1916: The Pediment for the House Wing of the United States Capitol, University of Delaware Press, Newark 1995
The Riverside Church in the City of New York: A Handbook of the Institution and Its Buildings, The Riverside Church, New York 1931

External links
Piccirilli Brothers
Piccirilli Brothers This website contains information about the Brothers' works throughout New York City and the nation.

American architectural sculptors
American male sculptors
Mott Haven, Bronx
Artists from the Bronx
American people of Italian descent
Sibling artists